Manjoi or Gugusan Manjoi is a satellite town in Ipoh, Perak, Malaysia, known as Boyan neighborhood in Ipoh, second to the renowned Kampung Baru at the heart of Kuala Lumpur, the nation's capital. It is known as Gugusan Manjoi in Malay due to its dense concentration in the state capital, Ipoh. Manjoi has a mosque and many feasible facilities for its residents. It is a combination of villages which was turned into a large neighborhood. This neighborhood is under the administration of Mukim Hulu Kinta of Kinta District.

Villages
These are the five Malay villages merged becoming what is known now as Gugusan Manjoi.

 Kampung Manjoi
 Kampung Tengku Husin
 Kampung Sungai Tapah
 Kampung Dato' Ahmad Said
 Kampung Tersusun Jelapang Baru

Related links
 Laman Komuniti Gugusan Manjoi
 Kampung Manjoi, Ipoh, Perak

Ipoh
Towns in Perak